Sady Rebbot (27 April 1935 – 12 October 1994) was a French actor. He appeared in 68 films and television shows between 1959 and 1994. He starred with Anna Karina in the 1962 film Vivre sa vie.

Partial filmography

 Rue des prairies (1959) - Un copain de Fernand (uncredited)
 Trapped by Fear (1960) - Le photographe de mode
 Les moutons de Panurge (1961) - (uncredited)
 La fille aux yeux d'or (1962) - Un dévorant
 Vivre sa vie (1962) - Raoul
 Chi lavora è perduto (1963) - Bonifacio
 Le bluffeur (1964) - André
 Brigade antigangs (1966) - Vrillard
 Shock Troops (1967) - Hardy
 Darling Caroline (1968) - L'homme enfermé avec Caroline
 Last Leap (1970) - Le professeur
 Trop petit mon ami (1970) - L'inspecteur Lepsky
 Friends (1971) - Pierre
 Le tueur (1972) - Lucien, le Grenoblois
 La révélation (1973) - Le couturier
 Le Drakkar (1973, TV Movie) - Michel
 Le bougnoul (1975) - Le substitut du procureur
 L'imprécateur (1977)
 Once in Paris... (1978) - 2nd Man at Party
 An Almost Perfect Affair (1979) - Customs official
 Brigade mondaine: La secte de Marrakech (1979) - Père Luc
 Les Maîtres du temps (1982) - Claude (voice)
 S.A.S. à San Salvador (1983) - Pablo
 My Nights Are More Beautiful Than Your Days (1989) - François
 La Révolution française (1989) - Le Président du Conseil Municipal (segment "Années Lumière, Les")

References

External links
 

1935 births
1994 deaths
French male film actors
French male television actors
People from Casablanca
Deaths from cancer in France
20th-century French male actors